This is a list of the ceremonial counties of England by their highest point.

See also
List of counties of England and Wales in 1964 by highest point
List of mountains and hills of the United Kingdom
List of Scottish council areas by highest point
List of Scottish counties by highest point
List of Welsh principal areas by highest point
List of Northern Ireland districts by highest point
List of Northern Ireland counties by highest point

References

Sources
County and Unitary Authority Tops from the Database of British and Irish Hills, which holds information on all English county and unitary authority tops.

Counties
Highest point
English counties